Ignacio Birkner (born 25 April 1971) is an Argentine alpine skier. He competed in three events at the 1988 Winter Olympics. He is the brother of Magdalena Birkner, Carolina Birkner, and Jorge Birkner.

References

1971 births
Living people
Argentine male alpine skiers
Olympic alpine skiers of Argentina
Alpine skiers at the 1988 Winter Olympics
Sportspeople from Bariloche